The 2005–06 SEC women's basketball season began with practices in October 2005, followed by the start of the 2005–06 NCAA Division I women's basketball season in November. Conference play started in early January 2006 and concluded in March, followed by the 2006 SEC women's basketball tournament at the Alltel Arena in North Little Rock, Arkansas.

Preseason

Preseason  All-SEC teams

Coaches select 5 players
Players in bold are choices for SEC Player of the Year

Rankings

SEC regular season

Postseason

SEC tournament

Honors and awards

All-SEC awards and teams

References

 
Southeastern Conference women's basketball seasons